Kalief Browder (May 25, 1993June 6, 2015) was an African American youth from The Bronx, New York, who was held at the Rikers Island jail complex, without trial, between 2010 and 2013 for allegedly stealing a backpack containing valuables. During his imprisonment, Browder was in solitary confinement for 700 days.

Two years after his release, Browder hanged himself at his parents' home. His case has been cited by activists campaigning for reform of the New York City criminal justice system and has attracted widespread attention in the years following his death. In 2017, Jay-Z produced a television documentary mini-series titled Time: The Kalief Browder Story. In January 2019, New York City settled a civil lawsuit with the Browder family for $3.3 million.

Early life 
At birth, Browder was placed into the care of Child Protective Services due to his mother's drug addiction. He was the youngest of seven biological siblings and one of the five placed for adoption. Browder's adoptive mother, Venida Browder, had raised thirty-four children by 2015, including fostered, adopted, and her biological children. The family lived in a two-story brick house on Prospect Avenue near the Bronx Zoo.

Browder attended New Day Academy, whose staff described him as very smart and a "fun guy".

In 2009, Browder was charged with third-degree grand larceny. Police testified that he had crashed a stolen bakery truck into a stationary car while joyriding. At the age of 16, he was charged as an adult, which conformed to state law at the time. He pleaded guilty but later said he was only a bystander. Browder was registered as a youthful offender and placed on probation.

Arrest 
On May 15, 2010, police apprehended Browder and a friend on Arthur Avenue near East 186th Street in the Belmont section of the Bronx. Browder said he was going home from a party. He thought the police were carrying out a routine stop-and-frisk, a police procedure he had undergone on a number of occasions.

Police officers were responding to a 9-1-1 call placed by Roberto Bautista about the theft of a backpack containing a camera, $700, a credit card, and an iPod Touch. Bautista had said, "Two male black guys ... they took my brother's book bag." Browder told the attending police officers, "I didn't rob anyone, you can check my pockets." The police searched Browder but they did not find the backpack. Bautista, who was sitting in the back seat of a police car, identified Browder and his friend as the thieves. He said the theft had occurred two weeks earlier. Bautista's testimony of the date of the theft varied between interviews, as well as other aspects of his story. Initially, Bautista implied that the robbery occurred the night of the 9-1-1 call, but upon questioning by officers at the scene, he stated that the robbery had occurred two weeks prior. At the scene, Bautista also implied after questioning that someone had merely "tried" to rob him and may not have succeeded. Furthermore, on the initial police report filed after the arrest, Bautista indicated the robbery had occurred "on or about May 2", but Bautista later told a detective that it happened on May 8.

Browder asked the officers why he was being charged and said, "I didn't do anything." A police officer told Browder he would be taken to the precinct and would likely be allowed to go home. Browder and his friend were taken to the 48th Precinct police station, where they were fingerprinted and kept in a holding cell for a few hours. They were then taken to the Bronx County Criminal Court, where they were processed at the court's central booking.

Seventeen hours after the arrest, Browder was interrogated by a police officer and a prosecutor. The following day, Browder was charged with robbery, grand larceny, and assault. Because he was on probation, Browder was not released. At his arraignment, he was charged with second-degree robbery and bail was set at $3,000; with a bail bondsman, the amount needed was $900. Browder's family could not raise this amount and borrowed money from a neighbor. When his family met with a bail bondsman to post his bail, they were told that, since he was on probation from his prior felony conviction, his probation officer had placed a probation violation hold on him so posting bail would not get him released from jail anyway. He was taken to jail at Rikers Island to await trial and resolution of his pending probation violation.

Imprisonment 
Browder was jailed at the Robert N. Davoren Center (RNDC) on Rikers Island. Preet Bharara, the United States Attorney for the Southern District of New York, said the RNDC had a "deep-seated culture of violence", in which inmates suffered "broken jaws, broken orbital bones, broken noses, long bone fractures, and lacerations requiring stitches".

Browder said inmates washed their own clothes with soap and a metal bucket, causing rust stains on the clothes. Browder's mother began visiting him weekly and provided him with clean clothes and snack money. To avoid becoming a target of the inmates, he slept on top of his belongings, including his bucket. Browder said he felt pressure to gain physical strength to defend himself from carceral violence. He said, "Every here and there I did a couple pullups or pushups. When I went in there, that's when I decided I wanted to get big."

Browder was a victim of carceral violence; on one occasion, he and other inmates were lined up against a wall. Correction Officers (CO) wanted to find the instigator of a fight. Browder and the inmates were punched, one by one; he said, "Their noses were leaking, their faces were bloody, their eyes were swollen". The guards threatened the inmates with solitary confinement if they reported their injuries.

On October 20, 2010, a gang member spat in Browder's face. Later in the day, Browder punched the gang leader and was set upon by fifteen gang members. On September 23, 2012, a video was recorded showing Browder in handcuffs being assaulted by guards. After a fight with an inmate, Browder was put in solitary confinement for two weeks; he later said of the other inmate, "He was throwing shoes at people. I told him to stop. I actually took his sneaker and I threw it, and he got mad. He swung on me, and we started fighting."

Altogether, Browder spent nearly two years in solitary confinement, mostly after fights with inmates. Browder later said that while in solitary confinement, correction officers beat him when he was showering. He said a verbal confrontation with a guard would escalate into a physical altercation. During his time in solitary confinement, Browder was allowed to participate in activities such as reading; he also studied for the General Educational Development (GED) examination.

Trial 
Brendan O'Meara was appointed as Browder's public defender. Browder always maintained his innocence. Although the assistant district attorney, Peter Kennedy, called Browder's a "relatively straightforward case", his trial was delayed by a backlog of work at the Bronx County District Attorney's office.

In July 2010, seventy-four days after his arrest, Browder was brought before a judge at Bronx County Hall of Justice. The grand jury indicted him on a charge of second-degree robbery. A second charge of punching and pushing Bautista was heard. Browder pleaded "not guilty"; his family went to a local bail bondsman about the new charge, but the posting of bail was denied because of Browder's prior violation of his probation.

On December 10, 2010, a potential trial date was set after prosecution and defense had submitted notices of readiness. On January 28, 2011, 258 days after his arrest, Browder appeared in court. The prosecution requested a deferment of proceedings. On June 23, 2011, Browder's record showed: "the People not ready, request one week; August 24, 2011, the People not ready, request one day; November 4, 2011, the People not ready, prosecutor on trial, request two weeks; and December 2, 2011, prosecutor on trial, request January 3, 2012."

Browder's communication with O'Meara was mostly through Browder's mother. O'Meara said Browder was "quiet, respectful, he wasn't rude", but he appeared "tougher and bigger" over time. Browder told O'Meara that he wanted to go to trial; he was offered a plea bargain of 3.5 years in prison if he pleaded guilty. Browder declined the offer. In June 2012, this period was reduced to 2.5 years, but Browder again declined the plea bargain.

On June 29, 2012, Browder's record showed; "the People not ready, request one week; September 28, 2012, the People not ready, request two weeks; November 2, 2012, the People not ready, request one week; December 14, 2012, the People not ready, request one week." After 961 days in Rikers, Browder had appeared before eight judges; he later opined, "these guys are just playing with my case".

On March 13, 2013, Browder appeared before Bronx judge Patricia DiMango. She offered Browder a plea bargain of immediate release for his admission of guilt to two misdemeanors with consideration of time already served. Browder refused the offer and was returned to Rikers. On May 29, 2013, DiMango freed Browder in anticipation of the dismissal of the charges against him one week hence. Bautista had returned to Mexico and could not give testimony against Browder.

It is currently unclear how long Browder was kept incarcerated after the DA's office realized they could not prove their case at trial.

Legal action 
After his release, Browder and his brother Akeem sought legal representation. A family member found the Brooklyn civil rights attorney Paul V. Prestia. In 2011, Prestia had represented a Haitian man who had been arrested in the Bronx and was wrongfully jailed for eight days. In November 2013, Browder filed a lawsuit against the New York City Police Department, the Bronx District Attorney, and the Department of Corrections. Prestia claimed that there had been a malicious prosecution, and the court had been misled about the prosecution's readiness for trial. Prestia also put to the court that the prosecution knew they would have no witness when Bautista returned to Mexico. The City of New York denied these allegations.

Education and employment 
Soon after his release, Browder passed the GED examination and later enrolled at the Bronx Community College (B.C.C.). He participated in the City University of New York's "Future Now" program, which offered a college education to previously incarcerated youths. Browder completed 11 credits and finished his semester with a grade point average of 3.56.

Because of depression, Browder did not attend college in the fall semester but re-enrolled in the spring. On May 11, 2015, Browder submitted a paper titled "A Closer Look at Solitary Confinement in the United States", for which he received an "A" grade. He wrote:
Solitary confinement should be looked at as a whole around the United States and even though changes toward the solitary confinement system have begun in some states, more needs to be done and addressed around the country. In a lot of jails and prisons there are a lot of living circumstances and practices that go on within that are not addressed that people need to shed light on like solitary confinement, for example. Maybe another form of punishment or segregation should be implemented to deal with inmates who break jail rules as opposed to inmates who cause severe harm to other inmates and correction officers because the mental health risk it poses are too great.

Browder worked at the B.C.C. as a tutor in mathematics for the GED. He wanted to work to support his mother. He worked for a while as a security guard but was dismissed when his history of mental illness came to light. He also handed out flyers near Wall Street. Browder said, "I see businessmen and businesswomen dressed in suits ... I want to be successful, like them".

Suicide attempts and death 
While incarcerated in 2010, Browder made his first suicide attempt. He tried a second time on February 8, 2012, trying to hang himself using strips of sheet tied to a ceiling light in the cell. Browder later said the COs goaded him to commit suicide. On another occasion, after an appearance before a judge, Browder made a sharp implement from the bucket in his cell and started to slit his wrists. An officer intervened.

After his release, Browder continued to have symptoms of depression. He said:

People tell me because I have this case against the city I'm all right. But I'm not all right. I'm messed up. I know that I might see some money from this case, but that's not going to help me mentally. I'm mentally scarred right now. That's how I feel. [There] are certain things that changed about me[,] and they might not [change] back. ... Before I went to jail, I didn't know about a lot of stuff, and, now that I'm aware, I'm paranoid. I feel like I was robbed of my happiness.

In November 2013, Browder made another suicide attempt and was admitted to the psychiatric ward of St. Barnabas Hospital, the first of three admissions to the ward. On June 6, 2015, at 12:15 p.m., Browder hanged himself from an air conditioning unit outside his bedroom window at his mother's home. His mother discovered his body.

Aftermath

Protests
On June 11, 2015, mourners mounted a three-hour vigil near Manhattan Detention Center and chanted "Justice for Kalief". A concurrent vigil was held on Rikers Island. People held up signs reading "Black Lives Matter". Browder was interred in an unidentified Bronx cemetery following a funeral service at Unity Funeral Chapels on June 16, 2015.

On June 27, 2015, an event on Rikers Island was organized through Facebook under the banner, "March to shut down Rikers—Justice for Kalief Browder! No to criminalization!" and the hashtags "#resistRikers" and "#ShutdownRikers". The event gained 500 Facebook responses. At the event, protesters held signs bearing the slogan "Black Lives Matter" and photographs and paintings of Browder.

On August 10, 2015, the anniversary of the shooting death of Michael Brown, fifty peaceful protesters led by Kalief's brother Akeem Browder gathered at the Bronx Supreme Court and chanted "Black Lives Matter".

On October 14, 2016, Browder's mother, Venida Browder, died of complications of a heart attack. Prestia said, "In my opinion, she literally died of a broken heart" because the "stress from this crusade coupled with the strain of the pending lawsuits against the city and the pain from the death were too much for her to bear". Kalief's brother Akeem shared similar thoughts, saying, "My mother has been holding herself strong, but she's heartbroken". She is buried next to her son.

Continuation of legal action 
After his death, Browder's estate continued his legal action against the city. Akeem Browder told BuzzFeed News, "We go back to court on March 21 [2017]. Judge is probably going to do what they've been doing—which is prolonging. It's a game that they play."

In January 2019, New York City settled a civil lawsuit with the Browder family for $3.3 million. Nobody from the Bronx DA's office was held personally accountable for keeping Browder incarcerated for three years without a trial or a conviction.

Government response 
In 2015, in Davis v. Ayala, U.S. Supreme Court Justice Anthony Kennedy cited Browder's case. He said:
 There are indications of a new and growing awareness in the broader public of the subject of corrections and of solitary confinement in particular. See, for example, Gonnerman, "Before the Law", The New Yorker, October 6, 2014, p. 26 (detailing the multiyear solitary confinement of Kalief Browder, who was held—but never tried—for stealing a backpack); Schwirtz and Winerip, "Man held at Rikers for 3 years without trial, kills himself" New York Times, June 9, 2015, p. A18 ... These are but a few examples of the expert scholarship that, along with continued attention from the legal community, no doubt will aid in the consideration of the many issues solitary confinement presents. And consideration of these issues is needed."

In July 2015, the House of Representatives, House Judiciary Committee, and House Judiciary Crime Subcommittee members John Conyers, Jr. and Sheila Jackson Lee sponsored and introduced a bill, H.R. 2875, the "Law Enforcement Trust and Integrity Act of 2015", and three other bills aimed at reforming youth incarceration. One of the bills in the package was H.R. 3155, "The Effective and Humane Treatment of Youth Act of 2015" or "Kalief's Law", named in honor of Browder. The bill contained many measures, such as the banning of solitary confinement for youth inmates, the prohibition of shackling and restraining of youth for court appearances without sufficient justification, and a requirement for states to provide a speedy trial. It entered the introductory phase of lawmaking and was referred to the Subcommittee on Crime, Terrorism, Homeland Security, and Investigations, but it ultimately did not become law.

On January 25, 2016, President Barack Obama signed an executive order to ban the solitary confinement of juveniles in federal prisons. Obama wrote an op-ed in The Washington Post, in which he cited Browder's case, writing, "In 2013, Kalief was released, having never stood trial ... He completed a successful semester at Bronx Community College. But life was a constant struggle to recover from the trauma of being locked up alone for 23 hours a day. One Saturday, he committed suicide at home. He was just 22 years old."

In October 2016, the New York City Correction Commissioner, Joseph Ponte, wrote an op-ed in the Gotham Gazette stating that New York City will cease to place prisoners between the ages of 19 and 21 in solitary confinement. He wrote, "This is an unprecedented milestone in New York State correctional history and, even more important, across the nation. To date, no other city or state has accomplished comparable punitive-segregation reforms for the 19 – 21 year-old age group." Mayor Bill de Blasio said, "Today's announcement shows that New York City is leading the nation down a new path toward rehabilitation and safety. New Yorkers can be proud that their correctional facilities are pioneering these smarter, more humane approaches." This marked the implementation of the measure that New York City officials had voted on in January 2015.

In 2017, de Blasio said, "New York City will close the Rikers Island jail facility." The New York City Council subsequently voted in October 2019 to close the Rikers Island jails and other New York City jails by 2026.

On April 10, 2017, Governor Andrew Cuomo signed into law the "Raise the Age" initiative that would send most cases involving 16- and 17-year-old defendants to the Family Court or be reviewed by judges with special training in social services.

Legacy

Media 
In the October 2014 issue of The New Yorker, Jennifer Gonnerman wrote an article about Browder. In November the same year, Browder and Prestia appeared on television talk show The View; Browder said his appearance on the show was a "good opportunity to get [his] voice heard" and that it was difficult to speak about his experience in prison. Rapper and businessman Jay Z also contacted Browder.

Ava DuVernay's 2016 Oscar-nominated documentary 13th, about race and mass incarceration, includes video interviews with Browder.

In March 2017, Time: The Kalief Browder Story, a six-part television documentary series produced by Jay Z and Harvey Weinstein, was broadcast on the Spike television network. Jay Z said, 
I knew right there that [Kalief] was a prophet. Some of our prophets go with tragedy, Martin Luther King, it ends tragically. But what comes from it, the life, the next iteration, the lives saved, and how this young man has moved culture forward is incredible.

In an essay published in Vibe, the singer John Legend wrote, 
New York failed Kalief. The list of things that went wrong in his case begins with his first encounter with the NYPD, whose practice of targeting black teens is well documented. The idea that being accused of stealing a backpack would lead to his arrest and detention would be absurd if it weren't actually tragic.

Browder's story was detailed in an episode of Last Week Tonight with John Oliver from 2022. Oliver went on to explain that they had originally intended to cover Browder's story in 2015, but chose not to as the intended episode would have aired the day after Browder's death.

Memorials 
On May 25, 2017, the corner of East 181st Street and Prospect Avenue in the Bronx was renamed "Kalief Browder Way" in his memory.

See also 
 Solitary confinement in the United States

References

External links 
 Remembering Kalief Browder a year after his suicide and why Rikers Island should be shut down, at Innocence Project
 Resources on Kalief Browder, from Stop Solitary for Kids.
 Violence inside Rikers Island The New Yorker
 Kalief Browder, "A closer look at solitary confinement in the United States", Bronx Community College paper.

1993 births
2015 suicides
21st-century African-American people
Penal system in the United States
Prisoners and detainees of New York (state)
Suicides by hanging in New York City
Suicides in New York City
People from the Bronx
2015 deaths
Burials in New York (state)
2010s in the Bronx
2015 in New York City